Der Volksstaat was the central organ of the German Social Democratic Workers Party  (Sozialdemokratische Arbeiterpartei Deutschlands). It was published in Leipzig from October 2, 1869 to September 23, 1876. It was edited by Wilhelm Liebknecht, with help from Karl Marx and Friedrich Engels. They also contributed to the newspaper as did many other socialists including Joseph Dietzgen.

Shortly after he became a member of the of the Social Democratic Party of Austria (SPÖ) in 1875, Karl Kautsky published his first contributions to Der Volksstaat.

References

External links
MIA Glossary of Periodicals

1869 establishments in Germany
1876 disestablishments in Germany
Defunct political magazines published in Germany
German-language magazines
Magazines established in 1869
Magazines disestablished in 1876
Magazines published in Leipzig
Socialist magazines
Social Democratic Party of Germany